The fifth season of the animated television series My Little Pony: Friendship Is Magic, developed by Lauren Faust, originally aired on the Discovery Family channel in the United States. The series is based on Hasbro's My Little Pony line of toys and animated works and is often referred by collectors to be the fourth generation, or "G4", of the My Little Pony franchise. Season 5 of the series premiered on April 4, 2015 on Discovery Family, an American pay television channel partly owned by Hasbro, and concluded on November 28.

The show follows a pony named Twilight Sparkle as she learns about friendship in the town of Ponyville. Twilight continues to learn with her close friends Applejack, Rarity, Fluttershy, Rainbow Dash and Pinkie Pie. Each represents a different face of friendship, and Twilight discovers herself to be a key part of the magical artifacts, the "Elements of Harmony". The ponies share adventures and help out other residents of Ponyville, while working out the troublesome moments in their own friendships.

Development

Concept 
Teasers for the season were provided by the show staff at the 2014 San Diego Comic-Con, including episodes centered around Twilight coping with the loss of the original library, the entire Pie family, Princess Luna dealing with a nightmare, and a 100th special episode focusing on the background characters. The staff also showed a brief animatic video from the first planned episode, showing the ability of Twilight's castle to direct the main characters to friendship problems around Equestria. Episodes showing more of the castle, about the six main characters, Pinkie Pie "breaking the fourth wall", Rainbow Dash saying "woah woah woah", and "confetti explosions" were to be expected.

The show's fifth season features Twilight continuing her journey of becoming a princess in Equestria with the help of her friends; they discover that her new castle includes a magical map that highlights troubles across Equestria for them to resolve. In the two-part premiere, they come across a town indicated on the map where all of its pony citizens have an equals sign as their cutie mark and odd, creepy smiles.

On February 25, 2015, it was announced at Australia's 2015 PonyCon that the show would have a second Christmas-themed episode. Another episode featured the Smooze, a gelatinous villain from the Generation 1 1986 film, My Little Pony: The Movie.

Production 
In an interview with World Screen, Stephen Davis announced that the series was going into its fifth season. On May 7, 2014, the series was renewed for a fifth season consisting of 26 episodes, with a tentative broadcast slated for April 4, 2015.

On June 17, 2014, Business Wire released a press release confirming that it would premiere sometime in the fourth quarter of 2014, but it was later revised by Hasbro. At BronyCon 2014, G.M. Berrow announced that she wrote an episode, which focused on Pinkie Pie.

Promotion 
From November 17 to December 22, 2014, the official My Little Pony YouTube channel released six weekly teaser trailers for the upcoming fifth season, each featuring one of the Mane Six as well as giving a premiere date on early 2015. Some scenes from "The Cutie Map" were teased in Rainbow Dash's and Rarity's recap videos for the season 5 teasers.

On January 19, 2015, a new trailer was released at PoNYCon in Brooklyn on February 16 by Friendship Is Magic season four directors Jayson Thiessen and Jim Miller; on that day, Thiessen and Miller shared some concept art of various characters and settings for this season, as well as a trailer that was originally planned to premiere at the convention was shown.

On March 5, 2015, Entertainment Weekly released another trailer revealing a new villain with commentary on the fifth season from Hasbro's executive director Brian Lenard and co-executive producer Meghan McCarthy.

Under the approval of Discovery Family and Hasbro, BABSCon showed the entire two-part season five premiere commercial-free on the same day as it premiered on the United States on April 4, 2015.

On April 7, 2015, Tina Guo revealed via Instagram that the one-hundredth episode involved Octavia [Melody] having an Electric Cello Dubstep situation and that the episode would on June 13, 2015.

On April 27, 2015, writer Amy Keating Rogers revealed via Twitter that she left the Friendship Is Magic writing staff due to her new full-time job as a writer at Disney. She also confirmed that she had written four episodes for this season, including The Mane Attraction, which featured a character voiced by Broadway actress Lena Hall.

On July 9, 2015, Hasbro corrected via Twitter that the season's second half would premiere sometime later in 2015, not the sixth season as previously announced. A month later, on August 11, 2015, it was revealed by Zap2it that the season's second half would premiere on September 12, 2015.

At the 2015 San Diego Comic-Con, it was revealed that Starlight Glimmer would return in the two-part Season 5 finale.

International broadcast 
The fifth season premiered in mid-2015 on Treehouse TV in Canada and debuted on November 2, 2015 on Boomerang in Australia.

Cast

Main 
 Tara Strong as Twilight Sparkle
 Rebecca Shoichet as Twilight Sparkle (singing voice)
 Tabitha St. Germain as Rarity
 Kazumi Evans as Rarity (singing voice)
 Ashleigh Ball as Applejack and Rainbow Dash
 Andrea Libman as Fluttershy and Pinkie Pie
 Shannon Chan-Kent as Pinkie Pie (singing voice)
 Cathy Weseluck as Spike

Recurring 
 Nicole Oliver as Princess Celestia
 Tabitha St. Germain as Princess Luna
 The Cutie Mark Crusaders
 Michelle Creber as Apple Bloom
 Madeleine Peters as Scootaloo
 Claire Corlett as Sweetie Belle

Minor

Single role 

 Peter New as Big McIntosh
 Shannon Chan-Kent as Silver Spoon
 Cathy Weseluck as Mayor Mare
 Nicole Oliver as Miss Cheerilee
 Michael Daingerfield as Braeburn
 John de Lancie as Discord
 Marÿke Hendrikse as Gilda
 Richard Newman as Cranky Doodle
 Michael Dobson as Bulk Biceps
 Britt McKillip as Princess Cadance
 Andrew Francis as Shining Armor
 Trevor Devall as Fancy Pants
 Sylvia Zaradic as Cherry Jubilee
 Kelly Metzger as Spitfire
 Matt Hill as Soarin
 Brian Drummond as Mr. Cake
 Kathleen Barr as Queen Chrysalis

Multiple roles 

 Kelly Sheridan as Starlight Glimmer and Sassy Saddles
 Sam Vincent as Party Favor
 Brian Drummond as Double Diamond, Sheriff Silverstar, and Filthy Rich
 Rebecca Shoichet as Sugar Belle and Night Glider
 Tabitha St. Germain as Granny Smith and Mrs. Cake
 Ashleigh Ball as Open Skies, Lyra Heartstrings, Daisy, and Lemon Hearts
 Ingrid Nilson as Maud Pie, Limestone Pie, and Marble Pie
 Terry Klassen as (young) Hoops
 Nicole Oliver as Tree Hugger and Cinnamon Chai
 Richard Ian Cox as Grampa Gruff and Featherweight
 Brenda Crichlow as Matilda, Amethyst Star, and Zecora
 Peter New as Doctor Hooves, Sunflower, Orchard Blossom, and Igneous Rock Pie
 Andrea Libman as Bon Bon, Pearly Stitch, and Cloudy Quartz
 Tabitha St. Germain as Aloe, Clear Skies, Muffins, Lotus Blossom, Twinkleshine, and Nightmare Moon
 Lee Tockar as Steven Magnet and Gummy
 Kazumi Evans as Octavia Melody, Rose, and Moondancer
 Cathy Weseluck as Sunshower, Lily, and Coco Pommel
 Peter Kelamis as Fashion Plate and Big Daddy McColt
 Chantal Strand as Diamond Tiara and Spoiled Rich

Guest stars

Single role 

 Jim Miller as Trouble Shoes
 Garry Chalk as Prince Rutherford
 Rebecca Husain as Minuette
 Jan Rabson as Wind Rider
 Sidika Larbes as Stormy Flare
 Graham Verchere as Pip Squeak
 Ellen Kennedy as Ma Hooffield 
 Lena Hall as Countess Coloratura
 Colin Murdock as Svengallop

Episodes

Songs

DVD release

Notes

References 

2015 American television seasons
2015 Canadian television seasons
5